Benji is a fictional character created by Joe Camp. He has been the focus of several movies from 1974 through the 2000s. It is also the title of the first film in the Benji franchise.

Benji is a small, lovable mixed-breed dog with an uncanny knack for being in the right place at the right time, usually to help someone overcome a problem.

Joe Camp is the creator and director of the Benji film franchise. His son Brandon Camp helmed the 2018 reboot film for Blumhouse Productions. The film was released on March 16, 2018 by Netflix.

Filmography

Films
 Benji (1974)
 Hawmps! (1976; cameo)
 For the Love of Benji (1977)
 The Double McGuffin (1979; cameo)
 Oh! Heavenly Dog (1980)
 Benji the Hunted (1987)
 Benji: Off the Leash! (2004)
 Benji (2018)

Television
 Benji's Very Own Christmas Story (1978)
 Benji at Work (1980 - short)
 Benji Takes a Dive at Marineland (1981 - short)
 Benji, Zax & the Alien Prince (1983 - series)

Documentaries
 Benji's Life Story (1976)
 The Phenomenon of Benji (1978)

Video games
Benji: Space Rescue (1983) for C64

Collections
Benji's Film Festival (2001)

References

External links

 
Film characters introduced in 1974
Fictional dogs
Mass media franchises